The  was a high dignitary and official during the last centuries of the Byzantine Empire, who acted as the chief minister and principal aide of the Byzantine emperor.

History and functions
'mediators' between the emperor and his subjects (cf. ). The title first became official in the mid-11th century, when it was conferred to Constantine Leichoudes, the future Ecumenical Patriarch of Constantinople. Rather, it was a title bestowed on the principal imperial secretary of the moment, who acted precisely as an "intermediary" between the emperor and other officials. This reflected the shift of the Byzantine government under the Komnenoi from the old Roman-style bureaucracy to a more restricted, aristocratic ruling class, where government was exercised within the imperial household, as in feudal Western Europe.

This arrangement was inherited by the restored Palaiologan-era Empire and continued in use until the Fall of Constantinople in May 1453. The office was also used in the same function in the Byzantine courts of Epirus, Morea, and Trebizond. In the latter case, it acquired the epithet  ('great').

List of 
Constantine Leichoudes, until 1050.
Theodore Styppeiotes, under Emperor Manuel I Komnenos.
John Kamateros, under Emperor Manuel I Komnenos.
Michael Hagiotheodorites, under Emperor Manuel I Komnenos.
Theodore Maurozomes, under Emperor Manuel I Komnenos.
Demetrios Komnenos Tornikes, under Emperor John III Vatatzes.
Theodore Mouzalon, until 1294.
Nikephoros Choumnos, 1294–1305, under Emperor Andronikos II Palaiologos.
Theodore Metochites, 1305–1328, under Emperor Andronikos II Palaiologos.
Alexios Apokaukos, 1328–1345, under Emperors Andronikos III Palaiologos and John V Palaiologos (r. 1341–1391).
Demetrios Kydones, 1347–1354, under Emperor John VI Kantakouzenos; 1369–1383 under Emperor John V Palaiologos; 1391–1396 under Emperor Manuel II Palaiologos.
Demetrios Palaiologos Goudeles, from the late reign of John V Palaiologos to  1416 under Manuel II Palaiologos
Hilario Doria, 1390s– 1423, under Manuel II Palaiologos
Demetrios Chrysoloras, 1403–1408 in Thessalonica under Emperor John VII Palaiologos.
John Phrangopoulos, 1428/9 in Morea under despot Theodore II Palaiologos
George Doukas Philanthropenos, 1430–1439.
Demetrios Palaiologos Kantakouzenos, 1434/5–1448 under Emperor John VIII Palaiologos.
George Doukas Philanthropenos and Manuel Iagaris Palaiologos, 1438–1439, while accompanying Emperor John VIII Palaiologos to Italy.
Loukas Notaras, 1434–1453, last mesazōn of the Byzantine Empire under Emperors John VIII Palaiologos and Constantine XI Palaiologos.

References

Sources

 

 
 
 
 

Heads of government
Byzantine administrative offices